Herb Thomas (born 1910) is an American former Negro league pitcher who played from 1928 to 1930.

After being spotted playing for the Brooklyn Blue Sox Thomas made his Negro leagues debut in 1928 with the New York Lincoln Giants. He played for New York again the following season, then finished his career in 1930 with the Brooklyn Royal Giants and the Hilldale Club.

References

External links
 and Baseball-Reference Black Baseball stats and Seamheads

1910 births
Possibly living people
Place of birth missing
Date of birth missing
Brooklyn Royal Giants players
Hilldale Club players
Lincoln Giants players
Baseball pitchers